Pierre Kast (22 September 1920, Paris20 October 1984, Rome) was a French screenwriter and film and television director.

Biography
A member of the Cahiers du cinéma in the 1950s, Kast created many short films and documentaries.

Kast died from a heart attack on board an aircraft on 20 October 1984, aged 64.

Filmography

Director 
 1949: Les Charmes de l'existence, codirected with Jean Grémillon (short film)
 1951: Les Femmes du Louvre (documentary)
 1951: Arithmétique (documentary)
 1952: Je sème à tout vent
 1954: L'Architecte maudit: Claude-Nicolas Ledoux (short film)
 1957: Le Corbusier, l'architecte du bonheur (short film)
 1957: Amour de poche
 1959: Images pour Baudelaire
 1959: Des ruines et des hommes, codirected with Marcelle Lioret (short film)
 1960: 
 1960: Une question d'assurance
 1960: La Morte saison des amours
 1960: Thank You, Natercia
 1962: P.X.O. (documentary)
 1963: Portuguese Vacation
 1964: 
 1965: La Brûlure de mille soleils (short film)
 1966: Les Carnets Brésiliens (TV documentary)
 1968: Bandeira Branca de Oxalá (documentary)
 1968: Drôle de jeu, codirected with Jean-Daniel Pollet
 1972: Les Soleils de l'Ile de Pâques
 1976: Un animal doué de déraison (A Nudez de Alexandra)
 1980: Le Soleil en face
 1982: La Guérilléra
 1985: L'Herbe rouge (TV)

Assistant director 
 1949: Pattes blanches by Jean Grémillon
 1951: L'Étrange Madame X by Jean Grémillon
 1952: Jeux interdits, de René Clément (non credited)
 1955: French Cancan by Jean Renoir
 1955: Les Carnets du Major Thompson by Preston Sturges

Writer 
 1951: Arithmétique with Raymond Queneau
 1952: Je sème à tout vent with François Chalais
 1955: The Red Cloak
 1959: Des ruines et des hommes with Marcelle Lioret
 1960:  with Jacques Doniol-Valcroze
 1960: Une question d'assurance
 1960: La Morte saison des amours
 1960: Merci Natercia! with Peter Oser
 1963: Vacances portugaises with Alain Aptekman, Jacques Doniol-Valcroze and Robert Scipion
 1964: Le Grain de sable with Alain Aptekman
 1965: Une balle au cœur with Didier Goulard and Jean-Daniel Pollet
 1965: La Brûlure de mille soleils with Eduard Luis
 1966: Les Carnets Brésiliens (TV)
 1968: Bandeira Branca de Oxalá with Jean-Gabriel Albicocco
 1970: Le Maître du temps with Jean-Daniel Pollet
 1971: Le Petit matin with Jean-Gabriel Albicocco
 1972: Les Soleils de l'Ile de Pâques
 1974: L'Ironie du sort with Paul Guimard and Édouard Molinaro
 1976: Un animal doué de déraison (A Nudez de Alexandra)
 1980: Le Soleil en face with  Alain Aptekman
 1982: La Guérilléra with  Antonio Tarruella
 1985: L'Herbe rouge (TV)

External links
 Pierre Kast biography on newwavefilm.com 
 

1920 births
1984 deaths
French film directors
French male screenwriters
20th-century French screenwriters
Writers from Paris
20th-century French male writers
French expatriates in Italy